For the purposes of directing mail, the United Kingdom (although the populations listed just show figures for England, Wales and Northern Ireland), is divided by Royal Mail into postcode areas. The postcode area is the largest geographical unit used and forms the initial characters of the alphanumeric UK postcode. There are currently 121 geographic postcode areas in use in the UK and a further 3 often combined with these covering the Crown Dependencies of Guernsey, Jersey and Isle of Man.

References

Postcode areas of the United Kingdom